The Tyrrhenian mole (Talpa tyrrhenica) is an extinct species of mammal in the family Talpidae. It was endemic to the Mediterranean islands of Corsica and Sardinia during the Pleistocene epoch.

First described in 1945 by Dorothea Bate, this species is known from several palaeontological sites of Sardinia ranging in age from Lower to Upper Pleistocene, and in one site of Middle Pleistocene age in southern Corsica.

See also
 List of extinct animals of Europe

References

Prehistoric mammals of Europe
Fauna of Corsica
Fauna of Sardinia
Extinct mammals of Europe
Pleistocene extinctions
Talpa
Fossil taxa described in 1945